Houda Ben Daya (born July 21, 1979 in Tunis) is a Tunisian judoka, who competed in the women's half-heavyweight category. She picked up a total of five medals, including three golds from the African Championships and a bronze from the 2001 Mediterranean Games in her native Tunis, and represented her nation Tunisia in the 78-kg class at the 2004 Summer Olympics.

Ben Daya qualified for the Tunisian squad in the women's half-heavyweight class (78 kg) at the 2004 Summer Olympics in Athens, by topping the field of judoka and receiving a berth from the African Championships in her native Tunis. She lost her opening match to Brazil's Edinanci Silva, who scored an ippon victory and overpowered her on the tatami with an uchi mata (inner thigh throw) at three minutes and eighteen seconds.

References

External links

1979 births
Living people
Tunisian female judoka
Olympic judoka of Tunisia
Judoka at the 2004 Summer Olympics
Sportspeople from Tunis
Mediterranean Games bronze medalists for Algeria
Competitors at the 2001 Mediterranean Games
Mediterranean Games medalists in judo
21st-century Tunisian people
African Games medalists in judo
Competitors at the 2003 All-Africa Games
African Games gold medalists for Tunisia
21st-century Tunisian women